Darandash (also Romanized as Dārāndāsh; also known as Tarandash) is a village in Harzandat-e Sharqi Rural District, in the Central District of Marand County, East Azerbaijan Province, Iran. At the 2006 census, its population was 327, in 64 families.

References 

Populated places in Marand County